The 1999 USL A-League was an American Division II league run by the United Soccer League during the summer of 1999.

Regular season

Eastern Conference

Northeast Division

Atlantic Division

Western Conference

Central Division

Pacific Division

Conference Quarterfinals

Eastern Conference

Western Conference

Conference semifinals

Eastern Conference Semifinal 1

The Hershey Wildcats advanced to the Eastern Conference finals.

Eastern Conference Semifinal 2

The Rochester Rhinos advanced to the Eastern Conference finals.

Western Conference Semifinal 1

The Minnesota Thunder advanced to the Western Conference final.

Western Conference Semifinal 2

The San Diego Flash advanced to the Western Conference final.

Conference finals

Eastern Conference

The Rochester Rhinos advanced to the final.

Western Conference

The Minnesota Thunder advanced to the final.

Final

MVP: Amos Magee, Minnesota Thunder

Points leaders

Honors
 MVP: John Swallen
 Leading goal scorer: Niall Thompson
 Leading goalkeeper: John Swallen
 Defender of the Year: Scott Schweitzer
 Rookie of the Year: Greg Simmonds
 Coach of the Year: Paul Riley
 Referee of the Year: Glenn Prechac
First Team All League
Goalkeeper: John Swallen
Defenders: Craig Demmin, Scott Schweitzer, Tenywa Bonseu, Kalin Bankov
Midfielders: Carlos Farias, Mauro Biello, Mac Cozier
Forwards: Mark Baena, Ernest Inneh, Niall Thompson
Second Team All League
Goalkeeper: Pat Onstad
Defenders: Jose Vasquez, John Coughlin, Gilbert Jean-Baptiste
Midfielders: Ian Russell, John Sulentic, Marvin Oliver
Forwards: Jamel Mitchell, Paul Conway, Darko Kolic, Onandi Lowe

References

External links
 The Year in American Soccer - 1999
 United Soccer Leagues (RSSSF)

2
1999 in Canadian soccer
1999